The Tuscumbia darter (Etheostoma tuscumbia) is a species of freshwater ray-finned fish, a darter from the subfamily Etheostomatinae, part of the family Percidae, which also contains the perches, ruffes and pikeperches. It is endemic to the southeastern United States where it occurs in well-vegetated springs along the Tennessee River in Alabama.

References

Freshwater fish of the United States
Etheostoma
Fish described in 1887
Taxonomy articles created by Polbot